Tamara Rhodes is a Canadian jazz singer.  She was born and raised in Vancouver, British Columbia.  She has been performing since a young age.  After high school, she moved to New York City where she attended the American Academy of Dramatic Arts. She then studied with cabaret legend Helen Baldassare at The New School University.  She also studied with the Professional Jazz Division at the Brooklyn-Queens Conservatory of Music, where she majored in "voice".

She appeared at the Cellar Jazz Club, Vancouver, British Columbia.

She sang the title track for the show Show Me Yours, in which two of her other songs were featured as well.  Two of her songs were also featured in Godiva's.  She is also the voice and co-writer of the theme song for the show The Guard, as well as of the song "Live Forever" which is the theme song for the vampire show Blood Ties.   Her musical style includes jazz, blues, soul, and R&B.

Discography
 Double Feature (2005)

References

External links 
 

Canadian women jazz singers
Musicians from Vancouver
Living people
Year of birth missing (living people)